Goo (Japanese: goo) is an Internet search engine (powered by Google) and web portal based in Japan, which is used to crawl and index primarily Japanese language websites (before switching to Google). Goo is operated by the Japanese NTT Resonant, a subsidiary of NTT Communications.

History

Commercial operation 
NTT-X was established as an operating company in 1999, and goo began full-fledged operation. In May goo started "goo shop", a shopping mall, a tie-up with Recruit, a joint project with Nikkei Newspaper Inc., an Internet research project jointly with Mitsubishi Research Institute, further enhanced as a portal. Goo's most popular service, "goo dictionary" started as the portal's free dictionary service in partnership with Sanseido. It was then working with rival Yahoo! JAPAN. Goo search results were displayed on Yahoo! JAPAN where there was no applicable search result. In 2004 and beyond, the search engine and information provision service of the portal site of the NTT provider such as OCN, Plala, WAKWAK, etc. are often using goo's search engine.

However, this service was closed on March 31, 2017.

"Teach me! Goo" was a user participation type Q & A site, 2.88 million monthly visitors (as of January 2007), formerly partnered with "OK Wave".

Other services included "environmental goo", goo blog, content distribution of the former BROBA. Goo was operated by 300 people as of 2015.

Domain dispute
Popcorn of the Kurashiki City of Okayama Prefecture acquired the domain name goo.co.jp in August 1996. Although the domain acquisition at that time had been operating as a non-adult site where the schoolgirl on the theme, goo.ne.jp became famous. In 1999 an adult site opened at that address. In November 2000 NTT-X, then goo's operating company filed a request to the Industrial Property Arbitration Center (currently the Japan Intellectual Property Arbitration Center) to relocate the domain, and in January 2001 the centre ordered the transfer of the domain. Popcorn complained about this and raised an application for domain usage to the Tokyo District Court in opposition to NTT-X in February 2001. The Tokyo District Court offered in April 2002 a ruling to dismiss Popcorn's claims. The appeal was rejected.

References

External links
 Goo search engine
 other goo search engine portal
 Imthienphuc

Internet search engines
Web portals
Japanese websites
NTT Communications